The black-spectacled brushfinch (Atlapetes melanopsis) is a species of bird in the family Passerellidae. It is endemic to Peru.

Its natural habitats are subtropical or tropical moist montane forest and subtropical or tropical high-altitude shrubland. It is threatened by habitat loss.

References

black-spectacled brushfinch
Birds of the Peruvian Andes
Endemic birds of Peru
black-spectacled brushfinch
Taxonomy articles created by Polbot